Zafarobod (Tajik: Зафаробод) is a town and jamoat in north-western Tajikistan. It is located in Sughd Region. It is the capital of Zafarobod district. Its population is 20,600 (2020).

References

External links
Satellite map at Maplandia.com

Populated places in Sughd Region
Jamoats of Tajikistan